Mohammad Nayeem Hasan (Bengali: মোহাম্মদ নাঈম হাসান; born 12 February 2000) is a Bangladeshi cricketer. He made his first-class debut for Chittagong Division in the 2016–17 National Cricket League on 10 October 2015. He made his Test match debut for the Bangladesh cricket team in November 2018, taking five wickets in the first innings. In the process, he became the youngest bowler to take a five-wicket haul on debut in Tests, at the age of 17 years and 356 days.

Domestic career
Nayeem made his Twenty20 debut for Chittagong Vikings on 29 November 2017 in the 2017–18 Bangladesh Premier League. He was the leading wicket-taker for Gazi Group Cricketers in the 2017–18 Dhaka Premier Division Cricket League, with 23 dismissals in 16 matches.

In October 2018, in the 2018–19 National Cricket League, Nayeem took eight wickets in the first innings against Dhaka Division. He finished as the leading wicket-taker in the 2018–19 National Cricket League, with twenty-eight dismissals in six matches.

In October 2018, Nayeem was named in the squad for the Chittagong Vikings team, following the draft for the 2018–19 Bangladesh Premier League. In December 2018, in the final round of fixtures in the 2018–19 Bangladesh Cricket League, he took eight wickets for 47 runs in the second innings bowling for East Zone against Central Zone. In August 2019, he was one of 35 cricketers named in a training camp ahead of Bangladesh's 2019–20 season. In November 2019, he was selected to play for the Sylhet Thunder in the 2019–20 Bangladesh Premier League.

International career
In December 2017, Nayeem was named in Bangladesh's squad for the 2018 Under-19 Cricket World Cup. The following month, he was named in Bangladesh's Test squad for their series against Sri Lanka, but he did not play.

In August 2018, Nayeem was one of twelve debutants to be selected for a 31-man preliminary squad for Bangladesh ahead of the 2018 Asia Cup. In November 2018, he was again named in Bangladesh's Test squad, this time for the series against the West Indies. He made his Test debut for Bangladesh against the West Indies on 22 November 2018. In the match, he took a five-wicket haul to become the eighth Bangladesh bowler to take a five-wicket haul on debut. He was also the youngest Bangladesh bowler, and third-youngest overall, to take a five wicket haul on debut, at the age of 17 years 356 days.

In December 2018, Nayeem was named in Bangladesh's team for the 2018 ACC Emerging Teams Asia Cup. The following month, he was named in Bangladesh's One Day International (ODI) squad for their series against New Zealand, but he did not play. In April 2019, he was named in Bangladesh's One Day International (ODI) squad for the 2019 Ireland Tri-Nation Series.

See also
 List of Bangladesh cricketers who have taken five-wicket hauls on Test debut
 List of Prime Bank Cricket Club cricketers

References

External links
 

2000 births
Living people
Bangladeshi cricketers
Bangladesh Test cricketers
Chittagong Division cricketers
Chattogram Challengers cricketers
Gazi Group cricketers
Prime Bank Cricket Club cricketers
People from Chittagong District
Cricketers who have taken five wickets on Test debut